Vanílson de Lima Silva (born 26 August 1990 in Goiânia), or simply Vanílson, is a Brazilian footballer. He currently plays for Jerash.

Honours

Náutico-RR
Campeonato Roraimense: 2012, 2013

Manaus
Campeonato Amazonense: 2021
Campeonato Amazonense Second Division: 2013

Vila Nova
Campeonato Brasileiro Série C: 2015
Campeonato Goiano Second Division: 2015

C.D. Nacional
Liga Portugal 2: 2017–18

References

External links
 Vanílson at playmakerstats.com (English version of ogol.com.br)
 

1990 births
Living people
Brazilian footballers
Brazilian expatriate footballers
Porto Alegre Futebol Clube players
Olaria Atlético Clube players
Associação Atlética Francana players
Manaus Futebol Clube players
Vila Nova Futebol Clube players
Itumbiara Esporte Clube players
Grêmio Esportivo Anápolis players
C.D. Nacional players
FC Atlético Cearense players
Goianésia Esporte Clube players
Arar FC players
Clube do Remo players
Jerash FC players
Campeonato Brasileiro Série C players
Campeonato Brasileiro Série D players
Liga Portugal 2 players
Saudi Second Division players
Expatriate footballers in Portugal
Expatriate footballers in Saudi Arabia
Brazilian expatriate sportspeople in Portugal
Brazilian expatriate sportspeople in Saudi Arabia
Association football forwards
Sportspeople from Goiânia